Jeffrey L. Criswell (born March 7, 1964) is a former American football offensive lineman who played twelve professional seasons in the National Football League. Criswell attended Lynnville-Sully High School and Graceland University.

References

1964 births
Living people
People from Grinnell, Iowa
American football offensive tackles
American football offensive guards
Graceland Yellowjackets football players
Indianapolis Colts players
New York Jets players
Kansas City Chiefs players
National Football League replacement players